AJS may refer to:
 AJS, a British motorcycle maker
 American Journal of Science
 The American Journal of Semiotics
 American Journal of Sociology
 Association for a More Just Society
 Association for Jewish Studies
 AJS Review, a journal
 Americans for Job Security
 American Judicature Society